The 1952 edition of the Campeonato Carioca kicked off on August 17, 1952 and ended on January 22, 1953. It was organized by FMF (Federação Metropolitana de Futebol, or Metropolitan Football Federation). Eleven teams participated. Vasco da Gama won the title for the 10th time. no teams were relegated.

System
The tournament would be disputed in a double round-robin format, with the team with the most points winning the title.

Extra Tournament
After the last edition of the Torneio Municipal, another tournament, officially called the Taça Carlos Martins da Rocha, popularly known as the Torneio Extra, was created to fill the gap in the clubs' schedules in the beginning of the year. That tournament only lasted one season, as the championship expanded to twelve teams in the following year. 

Twelve teams disputed that tournament; the eleven league teams and Oriente AC, champion of the amateur championship held by the Departamento Autônomo. They were divided into two groups of six, in which the teams within each group played each other in a single round-robin format, with the two best teams in each group qualifying into the Final phase, also played in a single round-robin format.

First phase

Group A

Group B

Final phase

Championship

References

Campeonato Carioca seasons
Carioca